Martin's BBQ is a Puerto Rican cuisine fast food restaurant chain that has 26 locations in Puerto Rico, where it is a "household name" and is one of the larger chains, along with two locations in Florida, in Orlando and in Tampa. The store's logo features a tough-looking bird and the motto "El Original!" (The Original!).

See also
 List of fast-food chicken restaurants

References

External links
 Martin's BBQ Site, Spanish
 Martin's BBQ Site, English
  
  

Fast-food chains of the United States
Restaurants in Puerto Rico
Regional restaurant chains in the United States
Fast-food poultry restaurants
Puerto Rican brands
Chicken chains of the United States
Puerto Rican cuisine